Friedrich Heimler (17 February 1942 – 7 November 2018) was a Brazilian Roman Catholic bishop.

Heimler was born in Germany and was ordained to the priesthood in 1970. He served as coadjutor bishop of the Roman Catholic Diocese of Umuarama, Brazil, from 1998 to 2002. He then served as bishop of the Roman Catholic Diocese of Cruz Alta from 2002 until 2014.

Notes

1942 births
2018 deaths
20th-century German Roman Catholic bishops
20th-century Roman Catholic bishops in Brazil
21st-century Roman Catholic bishops in Brazil
20th-century German Roman Catholic priests
Roman Catholic bishops of Umuarama
Roman Catholic bishops of Cruz Alta